Klok or KLOK may refer to:

People
Gersom Klok (born 1990), Dutch football player
Hans Klok (born 1969), Dutch magician, illusionist and actor
Jens Klok (1889–1974), Danish architect
Lukáš Klok (born 1995), Czech ice hockey player
Marc Klok (born 1993), Dutch professional footballer
Marko Klok (born 1968), Dutch volleyball player

Radio stations
KLOK (AM), in San Jose, California, broadcasting a World Ethnic format
KLOK-FM, in  Greenfield, California, broadcasting a Regional Mexican format
 KOSF, a radio station (103.7 FM) licensed to San Francisco, California, United States, which used the call sign KLOK-FM from January 1984 to August 1987

See also 
 Klock
 Kloc (disambiguation)
 KLOQ (disambiguation)
 Clock (disambiguation)
 CLOC (disambiguation)